Philippe Galera (born October 18, 1967 in Bègles, France) is a retired professional footballer. He played as an attacking midfielder.

External links
Philippe Galera profile at chamoisfc79.fr

1967 births
Living people
French footballers
Association football midfielders
FC Libourne players
Chamois Niortais F.C. players
Ligue 2 players